Papillon is the first studio album from Japanese singer Hitomi Shimatani. It was released on June 27, 2001, and hit #7 on the Oricon charts. Since then, it was last recorded as having sold around 147,030 copies.

The title track is a Japanese-language cover of "Doesn't Really Matter", a hit single by American singer Janet Jackson.

Track listing
 パピヨン:Papillon (Papiyon)
 Fantasista
 市場に行こう (Ichiba ni Ikou, Let's Go to the Market)
 Last Shooting Star
 His rhythm
 解放区 (album version) (Kaihouku, Free Zone)
 Motto...
 Splash
 Sugary
 Thanksful
 絶対温度 (Zettai Ondo, Absolute Temperature)
 Thinking of You
 パピヨン: Papillon (Eastern Butterfly) (Bonus Track)

Hitomi Shimatani albums
2001 debut albums